
Year 252 BC was a year of the pre-Julian Roman calendar. At the time it was known as the Year of the Consulship of Cotta and Geminus (or, less frequently, year 502 Ab urbe condita). The denomination 252 BC for this year has been used since the early medieval period, when the Anno Domini calendar era became the prevalent method in Europe for naming years.

Events 
 By place 
 Greece 
 Abantidas, the tyrant of Sicyon, is murdered by his enemies and is succeeded by his father, Paseas.

Births 

 Philopoemen, Greek general and statesman (d. 183 BC)

Deaths 
 Abantidas, tyrant of Sicyon (assassinated)

References